is a Japanese drink consisting of heated sake, sugar and a raw egg.  It translates as "egg sake", being made of the kanji 卵 tamago (egg) and 酒 sake.

Use as a cold remedy 

Tamagozake is a traditional home remedy for the common cold in Japan, however there is no medical proof of its efficacy.

Even though it is an alcoholic drink, it is sometimes given as a cold remedy to children as well as adults, much as hot toddies are used in Western countries.

Recipe 

Like most home remedies, there are several variant recipes for tamagozake, but the basic properties are the same.
Ingredients: 
 1 egg
 1 tbsp (15 mL) of honey
 200 mL of sake

For a non-alcoholic version, milk may be used as a substitute for sake.

See also 

 
 
 
 List of egg drinks

References 

Cocktails with sake
Cocktails with eggs
Drinking culture
Japanese cuisine
Japanese alcoholic drinks
Japanese cuisine terms
Rice drinks
Medical treatments
Traditional medicine